Avenida Doutor Mário Soares is multi-lane street at the Southern end of the Macau peninsula terminating at Praça Ferreira Amaral.

Naming 

The street Alameda Avenida Doutor Mário Soares was named after Mário Soares, Prime Minister of Portugal from 1976 to 1978 and from 1983 to 1985.

Major buildings 

Amongst others, the Grand Emperor Hotel & Casino, the F.I.T. Center of Macau and the Lakeview Tower apartment building are located at this street, though their official entrance lobbies is on the opposite side facing Avenida Comercial De Macau. The New Yaohan shopping mall and the Bank of China Building, Macau have their official address at this avenue.

At the southern end of the street, the Praça Ferreira Amaral roundabout and the Ponte Governador Nobre de Carvalho bridge are located.

See also
 List of roads in Macau

Gallery

References 

Roads in Macau